Ashland Avenue is a commuter rail station along the Blue Island Branch of the Metra Electric line in Calumet Park, Illinois.

Parking is available across from the station south of the 123rd Street bridge over Interstate 57. Street-side parking is also available on the northwest and southwest corners of Ashland Avenue and 124th Street. No bus connections are available at this station.

References

External links

Station from Ashland Avenue from Google Maps Street View

Metra stations in Illinois
Railway stations in Cook County, Illinois